Jamie Smyth (born 30 June 1976) is a British racing driver, best known for winning the 2007 British GTC Championship.

Career 
Smyth began racing in Karts before moving onto car racing in 2000 driving a Formula Ford.
 
His most notable achievement was winning the 2007 British GTC Championship, driving a Porsche 996 GT3. Other achievements include finishing 2nd overall and winning his class in the 2008 Britcar 24 Hour driving an Aston Martin N24, as well as winning the North West Formula Ford 1600 Championship in 2003, and the Southern Formula Ford 1600 Championship in 2004.

External links

References 

Welsh racing drivers
1976 births
Living people
British GT Championship drivers